Jan Olof Daniel Rickardsson (born 15 March 1982) is a Swedish cross-country skier who has competed since 2002.

Athletic career
His best World Cup finish in 2008 was second in two in 4 × 10 km relay events.

Rickardsson also competed at the FIS Nordic World Ski Championships 2009 in Liberec, finishing sixth in the 4 ×10 km relay, 20th in the 15 km, and 31st in the 50 km events.

In the Vancouver 2010 Winter Olympics, Rickardsson skied the first leg for the gold winning Swedish team in the 4 × 10 km  relay event.

In the Oslo 2011 World Championships Rickardsson skied the first leg for the Swedish silver winning team.

On 14 July 2013, Rickardsson and a friend were involved in a traffic accident, after their car had had a punctured tyre. As they stood by the car at the side of the road, they were hit by a recreational vehicle, the driver of which apparently failed to observe them in time. Rickardsson suffered ligament injuries and bruises, but his friend was killed.

At the 2014 Winter Olympics Rickardsson won bronze at the 15 km classical and helped Sweden win gold in the 4 × 10 km relay.

Cross-country skiing results
All results are sourced from the International Ski Federation (FIS).

Olympic Games
 3 medals – (2 gold, 1 bronze)

World Championships
 4 medals – (3 silver, 1 bronze)

World Cup

Season standings

Individual podiums
 3 victories – (2 , 1 ) 
 10 podiums – (5 , 5 )

Team podiums
 1 victory – (1 ) 
 8 podiums – (8 )

References

External links
 
 
 
 

1982 births
Living people
Swedish male cross-country skiers
Olympic cross-country skiers of Sweden
Olympic medalists in cross-country skiing
Olympic gold medalists for Sweden
Olympic bronze medalists for Sweden
Cross-country skiers at the 2010 Winter Olympics
Cross-country skiers at the 2014 Winter Olympics
Cross-country skiers at the 2018 Winter Olympics
Medalists at the 2010 Winter Olympics
Medalists at the 2014 Winter Olympics
FIS Nordic World Ski Championships medalists in cross-country skiing
Tour de Ski skiers
People from Hudiksvall Municipality
Hudiksvalls IF skiers